Abdullahi (also spelled Abdollahi and Abdillahi) is a male given name also common as a surname. It is a variation of the Arabic personal name Abdullah. The variant Abdullahi is most common in Nigeria, Saudi Arabia, Somalia, and Ethiopia.

Abdullahi may refer to: is a male given name, it is a variation of the Arabic language (عبدالله), meaning “God’s servant.”

Given name
Abdullahi Ahmed Addou (born 1936), Somali politician
Abdullahi Ahmed Irro, Somali military General
Abdillahi Deria, d(1967) former Sultan of the Isaaq clan
Abdullahi Afrah (died 2008), Somali leader of UIC
Abdullahi Yusuf Ahmed (born 1934), President of Somalia
Abdullahi Sudi Arale, Somali Guantanamo detainee
Abdullahi dan Fodio (c. 1766–1828), Sultan of Gwandu and scholar
Abdallahi ibn Muhammad (1846–1899) Mahdist Ansar ruler of Sudan
Abdullahi Ibrahim, Nigerian politician
Abdullahi Sheikh Ismail, Somali politician
Abdullahi Issa (1922–1988), first prime minister of Somalia
Abdullahi Sarki Mukhtar (born 1949), Nigerian retired Major-General
Abdullahi al-Harari, Ethiopian Islamic Scholar
Mohamed Abdullahi Mohamed, Prime Minister of Somalia
Abdullahi Aliyu Sumaila, Nigerian Administrator and Politician
Abdullahi Ali Ahmed Waafow (died 2022), Somali general and politician

Surname
Ahmed Aboki Abdullahi, Nigerian army officer
Hamza Abdullahi (1945–2019), Nigerian Air Force air marshal and governor
Hassan Abdillahi, Somali journalist
Mohamed Diriye Abdullahi (born 1958), Somali-Canadian scholar
Nasrollah Abdollahi (born 1951), Iranian football player and coach
Sadiq Abdullahi (born 1960), Nigerian tennis player

See also
Abdullah (name)
Abdollahi

Arabic masculine given names
Iranian-language surnames
Somali-language surnames
Somali given names
Somali masculine given names
Theophoric names
Patronymic surnames
Surnames from given names
Surnames of Somali origin
Surnames of Nigerian origin